Raging Silence is the 17th album by British Rock group Uriah Heep. It marked the studio debut of Canadian vocalist Bernie Shaw and keyboardist Phil Lanzon, both of whom have remained with the band since. It was produced by Richard Dodd and the title is an allusion to the Manfred Mann's Earth Band album The Roaring Silence (1976). It was the first Uriah Heep studio album to have a contemporary release on CD.

It opens with the old Argent hit "Hold Your Head Up", although Mick Box was pleased to be able to add a guitar solo. This track was the lead single from the album. The second single was "Blood Red Roses", written by the band's erstwhile vocalist Pete Goalby. The 7" came as a poster-sleeve (UK cat. Legacy LGY 101) and had "Rough Justice" as the B-side. The 12" p/s came with a patch and also added a previously unavailable live version of "Look at Yourself" (UK cat. Legacy LGYT 101). The original vinyl had the lyrics on the inner-bag.

Many of the tracks were in the set on the contemporary tour, as documented on the video Raging Through the Silence, and some have been featured in subsequent sets.

Track listings

Personnel
Uriah Heep
Mick Box – guitar, backing vocals
Lee Kerslake – drums, backing vocals
Trevor Bolder – bass guitar, backing vocals
Phil Lanzon – keyboards, backing vocals, lead vocals on single B-side "Miracle Child" & "Mr. Majestic", string arrangements on "When the War Is Over"
Bernie Shaw – lead vocals

Additional musicians
Brett Morgan – drums
Frank Ricotti – percussion
Maria Zackojiva – Russian spoken words on "Cry Freedom"

Production
Richard Dodd – producer, engineer, arrangements with Uriah Heep
Ashley Howe – pre-production engineer, arrangements with Uriah Heep
Tim Young – mastering at CBS Studios, London

Charts

References

Uriah Heep (band) albums
1989 albums
Enigma Records albums